Aarav Chowdhary (born 23 November 1965) is an Indian actor and model. He is best known for his role as Bhishma in the TV show Mahabharat. He is from Jaipur. He is an Indian actor  who appeared in several Bollywood movies such as Dhoom and Housefull 3. He got fame for his role as Bhishma Pitamah in the 2013 edition of Mahabharat on television. He has also acted in a television series named Iss Pyaar Ko Kya Naam Doon? Ek Baar Phir.

Filmography

Film

 Laado
 Dhoom as Rahul
 Right Yaaa Wrong as Sanjay Sridhar
 Ajith Kannada movie
 Vivegam as Shawn (Tamil film)
 Lakshya as Capt. Manjit Singh Dhingra
 Housefull 3 as Rajeev
 Bharat
 Action as Imran Kalil(Tamil film)
 B.A Pass 2
 88 antop hill as Kk Menon

Television

 Bharat Ka Veer Putra – Maharana Pratap as Rana Sanga 
 Mahabharat as Bhishma
 Gulaal as Raman
 Veer Shivaji as Dara Shikoh
 Jhansi Ki Rani as Mangal Pandey
 Iss Pyaar Ko Kya Naam Doon? Ek Baar Phir as Indrajeet Sarkar
Dhadkan 
Zindagi Mil Ke Bitayenge (DD Metro)
Captain Vyom as Captain Blaze
Aarambh as Purohit Indramitra
Jag Janani Maa Vaishno Devi - Kahani Mata Rani Ki as Senapathi Mahipal
Sasural Simar ka 2  as (2021-Present) Gajendra Oswal

Web series
Sunflower (2021) as Ramesh Kapoor

References

External links

Indian male television actors
Indian male film actors
Male actors from Jaipur
Living people
1981 births